Elections to Larne Borough Council were held on 30 May 1973 on the same day as the other Northern Irish local government elections. The election used three district electoral areas to elect a total of 15 councillors.

Election results

Districts summary

|- class="unsortable" align="centre"
!rowspan=2 align="left"|Ward
! % 
!Cllrs
! % 
!Cllrs
! %
!Cllrs
!rowspan=2|TotalCllrs
|- class="unsortable" align="center"
!colspan=2 bgcolor="" | Alliance
!colspan=2 bgcolor="" | UUP
!colspan=2 bgcolor="white"| Others
|-
|align="left"|Area A
|18.4
|1
|18.7
|0
|bgcolor="darkorange"|62.9
|bgcolor="darkorange"|2
|4
|-
|align="left"|Area B
|16.8
|1
|0.0
|0
|bgcolor="darkorange"|83.2
|bgcolor="darkorange"|3
|4
|-
|align="left"|Area C
|33.6
|2
|0.0
|0
|bgcolor="darkorange"|66.4
|bgcolor="darkorange"|5
|7
|-
|- class="unsortable" class="sortbottom" style="background:#C9C9C9"
|align="left"| Total
|25.5
|3
|4.8
|1
|69.7
|11
|15
|-
|}

Districts results

Area A

1973: 1 x Alliance, 1 x UUP, 1 x Loyalist, 1 x Independent

Area B

1973: 3 x Loyalist, 1 x Independent Unionist

Area C

1973: 4 x Loyalist, 2 x Alliance, 1 x Independent

References

Larne Borough Council elections
Larne